Robert Breault (born 1963) is an American operatic tenor.  Born in Michigan, he holds a B.M. degree (magna cum laude) from St. Norbert College (1985) from which he received a distinguished alumni award in 1997.  In addition, he holds a M.M. (1987), and a D.M.A. (1991) from the University of Michigan where he studied voice with soprano Lorna Haywood.  His early training also included two years of study at the San Francisco Merola Opera Program, and an internship with Michigan Opera Theatre.  He lives in Salt Lake City, Utah where he teaches voice and serves as Director of Opera at the University of Utah School of Music.

Performances
He is known for his work with opera companies that include New York City Opera, San Francisco Opera, Michigan Opera Theatre, Opera Theatre of St. Louis, Florentine Opera, Arizona Opera, Portland Opera, Fort Worth Opera, Edmonton Opera, Opera Hamilton, Opéra de Nice, Atlanta Opera, Arizona Opera, Chautauqua Opera, Madison Opera, New Orleans Opera, Opera Orchestra of New York, Opera Pacific, Utah Symphony and Opera, and Washington Concert Opera.  His extensive concert career includes performances with orchestras that include, the Atlanta Symphony Orchestra, Cleveland Orchestra, Colorado Symphony Orchestra, Edmonton Symphony Orchestra, Florida Philharmonic Orchestra, Florida Orchestra, Il Complesso Barocco, Jerusalem Symphony Orchestra, Milwaukee Symphony, Montreal Symphony, Mormon Tabernacle Choir, National Symphony Orchestra (Washington, D.C.), National Symphony Orchestra (Taiwan), L’Orchestre Métropolitain du Grand Montréal, Orchestre Philharmonique de Monte-Carlo, Orquesta Sinfonica Sinaloa de las Artes, Mazatlán, Mexico, the Orquesta Sinfónica de Puerto Rico, Pacific Symphony, Philadelphia Orchestra, Philharmonia Baroque Orchestra, San Diego Symphony, San Francisco Symphony, Santa Fe Symphony, St. Louis Symphony, St. Lawrence Choir, Toronto Mendelssohn Choir, Tucson Symphony Orchestra, Utah Symphony and Opera, The Vancouver Bach Choir, The Vancouver Chamber Choir, and the Virginia Symphony Orchestra.

Career
As a performer Breault is known for his strong acting skills and diverse repertoire, which ranges from Handel to current.  He was honored by New York City Opera in 2007 with a 'Kolozsvar Award' for his performance in Handel's ‘’Semele’’.  He has recorded several world premieres, including James DeMars’ opera ‘’Guadalupe’’ and his oratorio An American Requiem with the Mormon Tabernacle Choir, and Laurent Petitgirard's  Joseph Merrick dit Elephant Man.  Active as  a singing teacher since 1992, Breault has trained and worked with several successful singers including Celena Shafer, Paula Delligatti, Jennifer Larson, Gary Moss, Chad Hilligus, and Hugo Vera.  He works regularly as a voice teacher and director with the La Musica Lirica training program in Novafeltria, Italy. He is also active as a recitalist and had presented two debut recitals with the San Francisco Opera Schwabacher Debut Recital series.  Robert's dual role as singer and educator has been noted by the likes of Brian Kellow who, upon hearing Breault in Handel's Semele at New York City Opera, wrote a summary of his career in 2007 for Opera News.

Recordings
 2008   James Demars, '’Guadalupe’’  Canyon Records
 2004   Petitgirard, Joseph Merrick dit Elephant Man, Opéra de Nice DVD (Marco Polo label)
 2003   Kay Ward, There is a Season
 2003   Kay Ward, The Breath of Faith
 2000   Mormon Tabernacle Choir, A Mormon Tabernacle Christmas, Telarc
 2000   Richard Smith, Mountain Requiem, Mountain Chorale and Orchestra
 1999   Laurent Petitgirard, Joseph Merrick dit Elephant Man   
 1996   Haydn, Lord Nelson Mass, St. Lawrence Choir/Montreal Symphony
 1996   The International Children's Choir, Celestial Realms.
 1996   Tenor Soloist, Covenant Christmas Sampler
 1995   James DeMars An American Requiem with the Mormon Tabernacle Choir
 1993   Pachelbel Organ Works Vol. 4. With Organist Marilyn Mason. Musical Heritage Label
 1993   Pachelbel Organ Works Vol. 3. With Organist Marilyn Mason. Musical Heritage Label
 1991   Pachelbel Organ Works Vol. 2. with Organist Marilyn Mason. Musical Heritage Label

Opera roles performed
 Georges Bizet Les Pêcheurs de perles Nadir
 Carmen Don Jose
 Benjamin Britten Turn of the Screw Proremiere)
 Gaetano Donizetti Don Pasquale Ernesto
 Lucia di Lammermoor Edgardo/Arturo
 Carlisle Floyd Susannah Sam
 George Gershwin Of Thee I Sing Jenkins
 Gordon Getty Plump Jack Shallow/Hal
 Christoph Willibald Gluck Ezio Massimo
 George Friedrich Handel Rodelinda Grimoaldo
 Semele  Jupiter/Apollo
 Hercules  Hyllus
 Saul  Jonathan
 Solomon  Zadok
 Leoš Janáček Jenůfa Steva
 Franz Lehár The Merry Widow  Camille/St. Brioche
 Jules Massenet Esclarmonde Roland
 Werther Werther
 Gian Carlo Menotti Amahl and the Night Visitors Kaspar
 Claudio Monteverdi L’Incoronazione di Poppea Nerone
 Wolfgang Amadeus Mozart Don Giovanni Ottavio
 Die Zauberflöte Tamino
 Die Entführung aus dem Serail Belmonte/Pedrillo
 Idomeneo Idomeneo
 Thea Musgrave Pontalba-A Louisiana Legacy Célestin (World premiere)
 Otto Nicolai Merry Wives of Windsor Fenton
 Laurent Petitgirard Joseph Merrick dit Elephant Man Tom Norman (World premiere)
 Giacomo Puccini La Rondine Prunier/Ruggero
 La Bohème Rudolfo
 Madama Butterfly Pinkerton
 Gianni Schicchi Rinuccio
 Turandot Pong, Pang
 Tosca Cavaradossi
 Gioachino Rossini Armida Ubaldo/Gernando
 Il Barbiere di Siviglia Almaviva
 La Cenerentola Ramiro
 Tancredi Argirio
 Bedřich Smetana The Bartered Bride Vashek
 Richard Strauss Ariadne auf Naxos Brighella/Scaramuccio
 Der Rosenkavalier Tenor
 Salome Juden
 Giuseppe Verdi Falstaff Fenton
 Macbeth Malcolm/Macduff
 Nabucco Ismaele
 Rigoletto Duke
 La traviata Alfredo/Gastone
 Stiffelio Stiffelio
 Richard Wagner Tristan und Isolde Sailor/Shepherd
 William Walton Troilus and Cressida Pandarus

References

External links
 Official website

1963 births
American operatic tenors
Living people
Singers from Michigan
St. Norbert College alumni
University of Michigan School of Music, Theatre & Dance alumni
University of Utah faculty
Voice teachers
Classical musicians from Michigan